BBC Cymru Fyw is the online Welsh-language service provided by BBC Wales. It was launched in 2014 in order to replace the BBC Cymru ar lein service. It provides news coverage, magazine-style information and video clips, all through the medium of Welsh. Its services are also available via applications on iOS and Android systems.

Cymru Fyw received around 53,000 unique browser visits each week in 2016–2017, which was an increase of 11,000 visits compared to the previous year.

References

External links
 – official site

BBC New Media
Welsh websites
Broadcasting websites